Pennant Hills is a suburb in the Northern Sydney region, or Upper North Shore of Sydney, New South Wales, Australia. Pennant Hills is located 18 kilometres north-west of the Sydney central business district in the local government area of Hornsby Shire. West Pennant Hills is a separate suburb to the west of Pennant Hills and is part of the Hills District with a separate postcode.

History
The area was first explored by Governor Arthur Phillip shortly after 15 April 1788. It was noted that the party saw 'fine views of the mountains inland' (the Blue Mountains). Governor Phillip 'did not doubt that a large river would be found' nearby.

The first white settlement occurred in the area with the establishment of convict timber camps in the time of Governor Lachlan Macquarie. Permanent white settlement of Pennant Hills began only in the 1840s and took off with the arrival of the Northern railway line in the 1880s. In August 1912 the federal government opened a Wireless Telegraphy Station, the first of its kind on a national level. The suburb has grown considerably since the 1950s, when the motor car became commonplace.

There are two distinct theories about the origin of the name Pennant Hills.  One suggests the area was used as a site for raising flags, or pennants, for signalling purposes.  However, the only recorded evidence of such a signalling system in the vicinity was one operating from 1824 to 1829 in the present suburb of Ermington and the use of the term 'Pennant Hills' is found in much earlier documents.  In an 1801 muster list, 'Pennant Hills' is recorded as the place of residence of Ann Fay, wife of William Bellamy.  In 1802 correspondence from Governor King to Joseph Banks, King refers to "the range of Pennant Hills".  In 1920 the historian James Jervis suggested that the locality had been named after the naturalist Thomas Pennant, a prominent British ornithologist and zoologist and prolific author of the eighteenth century.  Although Pennant never visited Australia his friends and acquaintances included Sir Joseph Banks, Captain James Cook and Francis Grose (whose son Francis administered the colony of New South Wales when Arthur Phillip returned to England in 1792).  Under the patronage system of the time, colonial administrators and explorers often acknowledged their English supporters by naming geographical features in their honour.

The name Pennant Hills originally applied to the area now known as West Pennant Hills, located in the Hills District. However, when the northern railway line was built it passed through what is now Pennant Hills, so a suburb grew around the station and took on the name. The area around Thompsons Corner was renamed West Pennant Hills. Pennant Hills is hilly and the highest altitude is at Observatory Park on Pennant Hills Road, which once was the site of the old astronomical observatory.

During the 1960s and 1970s, Pennant Hills was the site of Chelmsford Private Hospital, where the unorthodox psychiatric Deep Sleep Therapy conducted by Dr Harry Bailey resulted in the deaths of dozens of patients.

Commercial areas
Pennant Hills is one of the major commercial centres of Hornsby Shire. Several dozen shops are located at the north-west of the railway line, along with the local Pennant Hills Library. Several restaurants and cafes are located around Yarrara Road. Pennant Hills Marketplace, a local shopping centre, is located along Hillcrest Road.
Residential houses are found in all areas in Pennant Hills, with recent modern apartments and office towers found along Pennant Hills Road. A significant commercial/industrial area can be found along Pennant Hills Road.

Pennant Hills is home to several entertainment venues including the Pennant Hills Hotel.

Transport

Pennant Hills railway station is on the Northern Line of the Sydney Trains network.

Pennant Hills Road is one of Sydney's major thoroughfares. Bus services by Transdev NSW and Hillsbus have their terminus in Pennant Hills and run to West Pennant Hills, Castle Hill and Cherrybrook.

Churches
 Pennant Hills was established as a Catholic parish in 1928 and a number of Catholic churches have been built since then. The parish's current church, St. Agatha's, was built in 1979. 

 St Mark's Anglican Church, 

 Pennant Hills Baptist Church 

 Pennant Hills Uniting Church  

 Thornleigh Seventh-day Adventist Church is located in Pennant Hills.

 Pennant Hills is also home to the first Danish Church in Australia. Crown Prince Frederik and Crown Princess Mary of Denmark made an official visit there on 6 March 2005.

Schools
Pennant Hills has two public schools: Pennant Hills Public School established in 1925 and Pennant Hills High School established in 1966, and two Catholic schools, Mount St Benedict College a girls secondary school and St. Agatha's Catholic Primary School.

Sport and recreation

Parks and reserves 

Pennant Hills is surrounded on two sides by large swathes of bushland. To the east, the suburb is bordered by the upper reaches of the Lane Cove River and its associated national park, whilst in the north-west, Pennant Hills borders Berowra Valley National Park. Both of these reserves contain extensive walking tracks within the boundaries of the suburb, with some linking to the Great North Walk.

Pennant Hills also contains many public parks, the largest being the Pennant Hills Park sportsground. This complex hosts many sporting facilities consisting of the Ern Holmes Oval for Australian Football and cricket, tennis and netball courts, a rugby union field, a football pitch, two hockey fields and an archery range. The Ern Holmes Oval was the home ground of the Pennant Hills Demons Australian Football Club until 2011.

Lilian Fraser Garden is also located in Pennant Hills. Originally maintained for many years by the noted government biologist Dr Lilian Fraser, after her death in 1987 her collection of rare and exotic plants was passed on to Hornsby Shire Council. Open free of charge to the public for viewing, the garden can also be hired for special events for a fee.

Sport and leisure 
Pennant Hills, due to its wide array of sporting facilities, plays home to a large number of sporting organisations. These organisations include the Pennant Hills Football Club, which was established in 1957, and the Pennant Hills Demons AFC, which has seen nine players go on to compete in the AFL. Although the Ern Holmes Oval is no longer the home ground of the Demons premiership team due to its size, many of the club's junior teams still compete in Pennant Hills.

Pennant Hills is also home to the Baden Powell Scout Centre, which borders the Lane Cove National Park. Opened in 1929, it initially served as a permanent camp for the unemployed during the Great Depression, and was visited by the Lord Baden-Powell himself in 1931. Situated on 36 acres of bushland, the centre is now home to the John Hill training centre and provides accommodation, catering and conference facilities for large groups, as well as activities such as high-ropes and rock climbing for camps.

The Pennant Hills area is home to the Pennant Hills Cherrybrook Rugby League Club affectionately known as the Stags. Whilst originally based at Pennant Hills Park the club now plays out of Greenway Oval at Cherrybrook. The club competes with distinction in the North Sydney District Junior Rugby League competition.

Population

Demographics
The population according to the 2016 census was 7,287. Of these: 
 The median age was 40 years, compared to the national median of 38 years. Children aged 0–14 years made up 18.0% of the population and people aged 65 years and over made up 16.5% of the population.
 59.3% of people were born in Australia. The most common countries of birth were China 6.6%, India 4.0%, England 3.4%, Hong Kong 2.9% and South Korea 2.5%.
 64.7% of people only spoke English at home. Other languages spoken at home included Mandarin 7.4%, Cantonese 5.5%, Korean 3.0%, Hindi 2.0% and Arabic 1.5%.
 The most common responses for religion were No Religion 28.5%, Catholic 21.9% and Anglican 14.4%.

Notable residents
 Early North Shore settler James Milson.
 Former Attorney General of Australia Philip Ruddock.
 Former St Kilda midfielder and 2010 Norm Smith Medallist Lenny Hayes, who played for the Pennant Hills Demons in the NSW Football League.
 Former  tagger and current  caretaker senior coach Mark McVeigh, who also played for the Demons in the NSW Football League.
 Former Sydney Swans premiership co-captain Jarrad McVeigh, who also played for Pennant Hills Demons in the NSW Football League.
 John and Ilsa Konrads, siblings and world record-breaking swimmers.
 Michaela Baranov, a contestant on the seventh season of The X Factor Australia
 Geraint F. Lewis, astrophysicist at the University of Sydney

Climate
As such, Pennant Hills has an Oceanic climate (Cfb). Its highs are around two degrees warmer than Sydney CBD in the summer, and a degree cooler in the winter. Whilst the rainfall is evenly distributed, the wettest month is March and the driest is September.

References

Sources

External links

  [CC-By-SA]

Suburbs of Sydney
Hornsby Shire